The Auglaize River (Shawnee: Kathinakithiipi) is a  tributary of the Maumee River in northwestern Ohio in the United States. It drains a primarily rural farming area in the watershed of Lake Erie. The name of the river was derived from the French term for it. The French called it "rivière à la Grande Glaize" (later spelled as "glaise", meaning river of Great Clay), referring to the soil in the area.

It flows southwest to Wapakoneta, then generally north in a zigzag course, past Delphos, Fort Jennings and Oakwood.

It receives the Ottawa River from the southeast in western Putnam County, northwest of Lima. It also receives the Blanchard River in western Putnam County. It receives the Little Auglaize River from the south in eastern Paulding County. It receives Flatrock Creek from the west in northeastern Paulding County.

During the days of the Ohio Country in the 18th century, the area around the river was inhabited by the Ottawa. During the mid-1790s the area near the mouth of the Auglaize surpassed Kekionga to the west as the center of Indian influence. Fort Defiance was constructed in 1794 near the confluence of the Auglaize and the Maumee by General Mad Anthony Wayne. Fort Amanda, constructed along the river southwest of Lima in 1812, was an important American outpost during the War of 1812.

Variant names
According to the Geographic Names Information System, the Auglaize River has also been known as:
 Au Glaize River
 Auglaise River
 Cowthenake sepe
 Glaize River 	
 Grand Au Glaze River 	
 Grand Glaise River 	
 Grand Glaize River 	
 Great au Glaise River
 Qusquasrundee

See also
 List of rivers of Ohio
 Grandglaize Creek, tributary of the Lake of the Ozarks, which also uses the Auglaize name

References

External links

 1831 Treaty with Ottawa
 Fort Defiance
 Findlay University: Fort Amanda

Rivers of Auglaize County, Ohio
Rivers of Ohio
Rivers of Allen County, Ohio
Rivers of Putnam County, Ohio
Rivers of Paulding County, Ohio
Rivers of Defiance County, Ohio
Tributaries of Lake Erie